"Put Yourself in My Place" is a song co-written and recorded by American country music artist Pam Tillis. It was released in August 1991 as the third single and title track from the album Put Yourself in My Place. The song reached number 11 on the Billboard Hot Country Singles & Tracks chart and peaked at number 8 on the RPM Country Tracks in Canada.  The song was written by Tillis and Carl Jackson.

Music video
The music video was directed by Michael Merriman and premiered in late 1991.

Chart performance

Year-end charts

References

1991 singles
1991 songs
Pam Tillis songs
Song recordings produced by Paul Worley
Arista Nashville singles
Songs written by Pam Tillis